Gaewalin Sriwanna (เกวลิน ศรีวรรณา) more known as Jean (ยีน) is an actress and model in Thailand. She also one of the 3 runner up of Miss Universe Thailand 2012. She came from Bangkok. Thailand. She had graduated from Rangsit University
majoring fine arts.

Filmography

Under Channel 3 Thailand

Under Channel 8 (Thailand)

References 

1992 births
Gaewalin Sriwanna
Living people
Gaewalin Sriwanna
Gaewalin Sriwanna
Gaewalin Sriwanna
Gaewalin Sriwanna